Bowyer–Trollinger Farm is a historic home and farm located at Childress, Montgomery County, Virginia.  The farmhouse was built in four sections beginning in about 1825 and ending in about 1910.  It started as a three-bay, two-story, apparently rectangular, single-pen log dwelling. Also on the property are the contributing farm office, mid-19th-century washhouse, spring house, barn, and corn crib, and an early 20th-century apple house/carbide gas lighting outbuilding.

It was listed on the National Register of Historic Places in 1991.

References

Houses on the National Register of Historic Places in Virginia
Farms on the National Register of Historic Places in Virginia
Houses in Montgomery County, Virginia
National Register of Historic Places in Montgomery County, Virginia